Charlie Deslandes (28 April 1900 – 4 April 1967) was an Australian rules footballer who played with Fitzroy in the Victorian Football League (VFL).

Notes

External links 
		

1900 births
1967 deaths
Australian rules footballers from Victoria (Australia)
Fitzroy Football Club players